"No Reason" is a song by Grinspoon. It was released as the third single from their third studio album New Detention. The song peaked at top 62 on the ARIA Singles Chart and polled at No. 15 on Triple J Hottest 100, 2002.

Track listing
"No Reason"
"Just Let It Go"
"Cluedo"
"No Reason" (Live at the Wireless)

Charts

References

2002 singles
Grinspoon songs
2002 songs
Song recordings produced by Phil McKellar
Universal Records singles
Songs written by Phil Jamieson